Leo Rodriguez (born Leandro Augusto da Silva, February 10, 1989) is a Brazilian singer and songwriter most famous for his version of "Bara Bará Bere Berê" that charted in Belgium and Netherlands charts.

"Bara Bará Bere Berê" already popular in Brazil for a long time, was recorded by Rodriguez in February 2012 and released on Brazilian Sony label Sony Edições accompanied by a music video. His version contains additional lyrics in Portuguese co-written by Rodríguez himself with Silvio Rodrígues. His version was released in Europe on June 19, 2012 and has charted in the Netherlands simultaneously to Alex Ferrari version charting in France. The Rodríguez version was released on Spinnin label in the Netherlands making it to No. 61 on chart dated August 18, 2012.

Rodriguez had his first break in 2009, when he sang live alongside João Carreiro & Capataz in Maringá. He also released his own album titled Atmosfera.

Discography

Albums

International singles

Others
2013: "Vai de Cavalinho"

Filmography

Television

References

External links
Official website
Last.fm

21st-century Brazilian male singers
21st-century Brazilian singers
1989 births
Living people
Musicians from São Paulo (state)
The Farm (TV series) contestants
People from Descalvado